Björke is a populated area, a socken (not to be confused with parish), on the Swedish island of Gotland. It comprises the same area as the administrative Björke District, established on 1January 2016.

Geography 
Björke is situated in the central part of Gotland. The medieval Björke Church is located in the socken. , Björke Church belongs to Björke parish in Romaklosters pastorat.

References

External links 

Objects from Björke at the Digital Museum by Nordic Museum

Populated places in Gotland County